Albert Rehm (August 15, 1871 (in Augsburg)- July 31, 1949 (in Munich)) was a German philologist best known for his work on the Antikythera mechanism - he was the first to propose that it was an astronomical calculator.

Services 
Albert Rehm has made numerous contributions to both education and science. He has made important contributions to realism in particular: the volume Precise Sciences in the Introduction to Classical Philology by Alfred Gercke and Eduard Norden, as well as numerous essays and articles for the Realencyclopädie der classischen Altertumswissenschaft. He also wrote valuable works in epigraphy and archeology .

Literature 
He is mentioned in these books:

References 

1871 births
Scientists from Augsburg
1949 deaths
German philologists